The Vineyard is an American docusoap series that premiered on ABC Family on July 23, 2013. It chronicles the lives of eleven young adults who work together at The Black Dog restaurant and reside in a house on Martha's Vineyard. The first season consists of eight hour-long episodes, and was filmed from May to late June.

In March 2014, a spokesperson for the ABC Family show confirmed that the drama was cancelled by the network. There was no further comment.

Cast

 Taelyr Robinson
 Sophi Alvarez
 Lou D'Agostino
 Katie Tardif
 Jon Franco
 Jackie Lyons
 Gabby LaPointe
 Emily Burns
 Daniel Lipshutz
 Cat Todd
 Ben Rossi
 Natasha Ponomaroff
 Sean O'Brien

Episodes

References

14. Tumin, Remy http://mvgazette.com/news/2014/03/12/reality-bites-abc-family-and-marthas-vineyard-break?k=vg533dcdf8e847d&r=1 (March 12, 2014)

External links
 
 
 Facebook promotional page

2010s American reality television series
2013 American television series debuts
2013 American television series endings
English-language television shows
Television shows set in Massachusetts
Martha's Vineyard in fiction
ABC Family original programming
Television series by Disney–ABC Domestic Television
American television docudramas